Muhammad Yousaf (born 1952), also spelled as Mohammed Yousuf, is a Pakistani snooker player. He is the winner of the 1994 IBSF World Snooker Championship, 2006 IBSF World Masters Championship, and 1998 ACBS Asian Snooker Championship.

Biography
Yousaf was born in Mumbai, India and later migrated to Lahore, Punjab, Pakistan. Currently, he is resident in Karachi and coaches young snooker players in one of the largest snooker clubs of Pakistan, Dolphin Snooker Club, situated in Chandni Chowk, Lahore.

Career
In 1994, at the IBSF World Snooker Championship at Johannesburg, he defeated Iceland’s Johannes R. Johannesson 11–9 to become the IBSF World Snooker Champion. In 2006, he beat Glen Wilkinson of Australia in Amman 5–4 to win the IBSF World Masters Championship in Jordan. He also competed at the 2006 Asian Games in Doha.

Achievements
 2006 IBSF World Masters Champion
 2002 Asian Champion
 2000 IBSF World Championship Quarter Final
 1998 ACBS Asian Snooker Champion
 1994 IBSF World Snooker Champion
 1996 Asian champion

See also
 Muhammad Asif (snooker player)
 Khurram Hussain Agha
 Shokat Ali
 Saleh Mohammad (snooker player)
 Naveen Perwani

References

1952 births
Living people
Sportspeople from Mumbai
Muhajir people
Pakistani snooker players
Pakistani Muslims
Recipients of the Pride of Performance
Sportspeople from Rawalpindi
Sportspeople from Karachi
Asian Games medalists in cue sports
Cue sports players at the 2006 Asian Games
Cue sports players at the 2002 Asian Games
Asian Games bronze medalists for Pakistan
Medalists at the 2002 Asian Games
Snooker players from Punjab, Pakistan
Cue sports players from Maharashtra
Cue sports players at the 1998 Asian Games